Batanopride (BMY-25,801) is an antiemetic drug of the benzamide class which acts as a selective 5-HT3 receptor antagonist. It was trialled to reduce nausea during cancer chemotherapy, but was never approved for medical use due to dose-limiting side effects including hypotension and long QT syndrome.

References 

5-HT3 antagonists
Antiemetics
Salicylamide ethers
Anilines
Chlorobenzenes
Diethylamino compounds